Amabela is a genus of moths of the family Noctuidae.

Species
Amabela carsinodes Hampson, 1924
Amabela delicata Moschler, 1880

References
Natural History Museum Lepidoptera genus database

Catocalinae
Noctuoidea genera